The Chosen One is a 2007 American animated action comedy film. It was directed by Chris Lackey, written by Chad Fifer and Chris Lackey, produced by Andreas Olavarria, and starring Chad Fifer, Tim Curry, Traci Lords and Lance Henriksen.

Voice cast 
 Chad Fifer as Lou Hanske
 Chris Sarandon as Zebulon "Zeb" Kirk
 Danielle Fishel as Donna Goldstein
 Tim Curry as Lucifer
 Lance Henriksen as Cardinal Fred
 Laura Prepon as Rachel Cruz
 Debra Wilson as Akia May
 Traci Lords as Ms. Sultry
 Scott MacDonell as Gary / Various
 Andreas Olavarria as Claude / Various

References

External links 
 

2007 films
2007 action comedy films
The Devil in film
American action comedy films
2007 animated films
2007 comedy films
2000s English-language films
2000s American films